The list of ship launches in 2018 includes a chronological list of ships launched in 2018.

Launched

References

2018
Ship launches
 
Ship launches